Bernabe or Bernabé  is a surname.

Those bearing it include:

Adrián Bernabé (born 2001), Spanish football player
Antonio Valero de Bernabé (1790–1863), Puerto Rico-born Spanish soldier
Paulino Bernabe (disambiguation)
Teresa Bernabe (born 1983), Spanish musician